iPod Hi-Fi is a discontinued speaker system that was developed and manufactured by Apple Inc. and was released on February 28, 2006, for use with any iPod digital music player. The iPod Hi-Fi retailed at the Apple Store for US$349 until its discontinuation on September 5, 2007.

Accolades
The iPod Hi-Fi was praised for its big rich sound, bass response, ease of use, remote performance, and battery options.

Criticism
The iPod Hi-Fi received criticism due to its high price, lack of an AM/FM radio, and the limited functionality of its remote control.

See also 
 HomePod
 HomePod Mini

References

External links
 CNET Review
 PC Magazine Review 
 Stereophile Review
 Independent User Review

IPod accessories
Apple Inc. peripherals
Products introduced in 2006
Products and services discontinued in 2007